Chondrillidae is a family of sea sponges within the order Chondrillida.

References 

Sponge families
Verongimorpha